The High Commission of Canada in the United Kingdom is the diplomatic mission of Canada to the United Kingdom. It is housed at Canada House on Trafalgar Square in central London, with an additional Regional Service Centre at 3 Furzeground Way in Stockley Park, Uxbridge.

History

The Canadian high commission in London is Canada's oldest diplomatic posting, having been established in 1880. Canada House, in Trafalgar Square, became the site of the mission in 1923. In 1962, Canada also acquired the former American Embassy at 1, Grosvenor Square in London's Mayfair district, and it was renamed Macdonald House. Macdonald House was the official residence of the Canadian High Commissioner until the building was vacated in mid-December 2014, after having been sold for redevelopment.

Canada's presence in London goes back to 1869, when Sir John Rose, 1st Baronet was appointed as Canada's informal representative in Britain. This was the first Canadian diplomatic posting and the first from any British colony to the motherland.  Since Canada did not have a foreign ministry, Rose acted as the personal representative of Canada's prime minister, Sir John A. Macdonald.  Rose's position was retained despite a change of government in Canada, and his position was given the title "Financial Commissioner for the Dominion of Canada". Additionally, in 1874, the government of Prime Minister Alexander Mackenzie named Edward Jenkins as Canada's Agent-General in London. Jenkins, a British Liberal Party Member of Parliament in the House of Commons of the United Kingdom, had grown up in Quebec. His duties in that role were clarified to the House of Commons of Canada in May 1874 by Canadian Prime Minister Alexander Mackenzie, who said that Jenkins would have surveillance of the Canadian emigration business in London and occasionally be asked to attend to other business of a confidential nature. In addition, he would be "expected to give some little attention to Canadian gentlemen sojourning in London". Jenkins held the post for two years. Mackenzie then appointed former Nova Scotia premier William Annand as agent general in 1876; he held the position until Mackenzie's government was defeated.

When Macdonald returned to power in 1878, he wanted to elevate the office of Financial Commissioner to "resident minister", but this was disallowed by Britain, who offered the title of high commissioner instead. This was the origin of the practice, which continues to this day, whereby members of the Commonwealth send high commissioners rather than ambassadors to each other.

The first official high commissioner was Alexander Tilloch Galt, appointed in 1880. The office remained the most important in Canadian diplomacy and was always filled by political appointees rather than career diplomats, even after Canada created a Ministry of External Affairs in 1909.

As the high commission's role grew, it needed to expand its facilities, and on 29 June 1925, King George V and Queen Mary officiated at the dedication of Canada House on Trafalgar Square. The mission's needs continued to expand, however, and Canada acquired the former American embassy on Grosvenor Square, renaming it Macdonald House, in honour of Canada's first prime minister. Macdonald House opened on Canada Day (1 July) in 1961.

Canada House was refurbished in 1997–98. After years of operating from two buildings, in mid-December 2014, all of the activities of the High Commission were regrouped in the expanded and fully refurbished Canada House on Trafalgar Square. In order to expand the historic Canada House, the Government of Canada had purchased the adjoining building at 2-3-4 Cockspur Street, originally built as the British head office of the Sunlife Assurance Company of Canada in 1927.  It is remarkable that the Sunlife building had been built to match the architecture of Canada House.  For that reason, it does look, from the outside, as if the building was built from the start as an extension of Canada House, although this is not the case. The historic Canada House and the former Sunlife head office now form a very coherent ensemble.

List of heads of mission

Gallery

See also
British High Commission, Ottawa
Canada House
Canada–United Kingdom relations
Macdonald House, London

References

External links

Official website
High Commissioner's biography

Canada
London
1880 establishments in Canada
1880 establishments in the United Kingdom
Canada and the Commonwealth of Nations

United Kingdom
Canada
Canada–United Kingdom relations

he:בית קנדה